Niastella koreensis  is a bacterium from the genus of Niastella which has been isolated from soil from a ginseng field in Yeongju in Korea.

References

External links
Type strain of Niastella koreensis at BacDive -  the Bacterial Diversity Metadatabase	

Chitinophagia
Bacteria described in 2006